USS Indianapolis: Men of Courage (also titled USS Indianapolis: Disaster in the Philippine Sea) is a 2016 American war disaster film directed by Mario Van Peebles and written by Cam Cannon and Richard Rionda Del Castro, based largely on the true story of the loss of the ship of the same name in the closing stages of the Second World War. The film stars Nicolas Cage, Tom Sizemore, Thomas Jane, Matt Lanter,  Brian Presley, and Cody Walker. Principal photography began on June 19, 2015 in Mobile, Alabama. The film premiered in the Philippines on August 24, 2016. It was released as a digital rental on iTunes and Amazon in the United States on October 14, 2016 and in limited theaters during the Veterans Day weekend.

Plot 
In 1945, the Portland-class heavy cruiser , commanded by Captain Charles McVay, delivers parts of the atomic bomb that would later be used to bomb Hiroshima at the end of World War II. While patrolling in the Philippine Sea, on July 30 in 1945, the unescorted ship is torpedoed and sunk by the Imperial Japanese Navy (IJN) submarine I-58, taking 300 crewmen with it to the bottom of the Philippine Sea, while the rest climb out of the ship and were left stranded at sea for five days without food and water in shark-infested waters.

With no hope for five days, most of the remaining crew-members were eaten by sharks or would die of salt water poisoning by drinking seawater (which also caused some of those injured to die from seasickness and infectious wounds). Others swam off from their groups after hallucinating of a non-existent island, never to be seen again. On the 5th day, the surviving crew were rescued by an airplane pilot who spotted them by chance and called for a rescue. Only 316 survived the disaster. Looking for a scapegoat for their own gross negligence, the US Navy court-martials and convicts Captain McVay for "hazarding his ship by failing to zigzag", despite overwhelming evidence supporting McVay (such as even having the former captain of the IJN's I-58 submarine to testify for the trial, which proved McVay to be not at fault). It ends with Captain McVay committing suicide years after the tragedy after being harassed and tormented with phone calls and mail from angry and grief-stricken relatives of the deceased crew-members, as well as the media (mostly in the form of newspapers, which placed the blame on him for the ship's sinking). In the movie's postscript they show President Bill Clinton exonerating Captain McVay of all charges on October 30, 2000.

In a subplot, Indianapolis crewmember Mike D'Antonio falls in love with his childhood friend Brian "Bama" Smithwick's friend and love interest Clara. Smithwick is a shipmate of D'Antonio and diver on the doomed ship. D'Antonio purchases an engagement ring before the trip to Tinian to propose to the girl who tells D'Antonio before the trip that she is expecting their first child. During a brawl involving two of the crewmen, D'Antonio loses the ring and one of the crew members, Alvin, steals it. After the ship is destroyed, Smithwick and D'Antonio spend the next few days in the sea with the rest of the crew where D'Antonio succumbs to massive leg injuries received in a shark attack and Smithwick is given the engagement ring by Alvin. Bama proposes to Clara to help her raise her child and she accepts his proposal.

While the credits roll, two Navy sailors recount the sharks in the waters and real rescue footage is shown along with many still shots of lost sailors.

Cast
 Nicolas Cage as Captain Charles B. McVay III
 Tom Sizemore as Chief Petty Officer McWhorter
 Thomas Jane as Lieutenant Adrian Marks
 Matt Lanter as Chief Petty Officer Brian "Bama" Smithwick
 James Remar as Rear Admiral William S. Parnell
 Brian Presley as Waxman
  Yutaka Takeuchi as Commander Mochitsura Hashimoto
 Johnny Wactor as Connor
 Adam Scott Miller as Mike D'Antonio
 Cody Walker as Petty Officer Third Class West
 Callard Harris as Lieutenant Standish
 Mandela Van Peebles as Theodore
 Craig Tate as Garrison
 Joey Capone as Alvin
 Emily Tennant as Clara
 Shamar Sanders as Quinn
 Max Ryan as Lieutenant Wilbur "Chuck" Gwinn
 Patrice Cols as Jean-Pierre
Currie Graham as Captain Ryan, Prosecutor In McVay's Court Martial.
 Matthew Pearson as "Deuce"
 Timothy Patrick Cavanaugh as Commander Cavanaugh
 Jose Julian as Sanchez
 Weronika Rosati as Louise, McVay's Wife
 Mattie Liptak as Paul
 Justin Nesbitt as Lindy

Production

Development 
The project USS Indianapolis: Men of Courage, set in July 1945, is about the Navy ship  and was first announced in 2011 by Hannibal Classics. Cam Cannon and Richard Rionda Del Castro, the latter also being engaged as a producer, wrote the script for the film. The focus of the film is on the bravery of the crewmen aboard Indianapolis. 

On December 17, 2013, Hannibal set Mario Van Peebles to direct the film, while Patriot Pictures would finance and Rionda Del Castro would produce along with Michael Mendelsohn. The studio (Hannibal) had developed the film in five years by consulting the survivors of the disaster, including the US Navy and the US Coast Guard. The US Navy helped with the completion and finalization of the last draft of the script. 

Walt Conti of Edge Innovations would provide the animated sharks, and the production reportedly secured two fully operational World War II-era planes to portray the planes that were involved in the real rescue operations after the disaster. Silo Inc. and Hydroflex were attached to handle digital effects and underwater filming for the film, respectively.  and  would both be used along with the Battleship Memorial Park to depict Indianapolis and the Japanese submarine. 

The film is dedicated to the men of the USS Indianapolis and their families.

 Pre-production 
On February 5, 2015, Nicolas Cage was set to play the lead role of Captain Charles McVay in the film.<ref name=CageCast>{{cite news |last1=McNary|first1=Dave |title=Berlin: Nicolas Cage to Star in WWII Drama 'USS Indianapolis' (EXCLUSIVE) |url= https://variety.com/2015/film/news/berlin-nicolas-cage-on-uss-indianapolis-men-of-courage-exclusive-1201422962/ |access-date=June 25, 2015 |work=variety.com |date=February 5, 2015}}</ref> 

Matt Lanter was set on April 1, 2015 to play a US Navy diver, named Chief Petty Officer Brian "Bama" Smithwick. Producers had to put the production on hold temporarily to save the plane, but "the salvage company was unable to save the aircraft," which was broken apart, according to the producers. The plane was provided by firefighters from Washington and was being piloted by Fred and Jayson Owen. 

After filming on July 14 in downtown Mobile, Cage met a real Navy veteran named Richard Stephens on a bench at Bienville Square, Stephens was one of the survivors of the ship, so Cage and Stephens had an extended discussion about the disaster.

Reception
On review aggregator Rotten Tomatoes the film holds an approval rating of 17% based on 12 reviews, with an average rating of 3.4/10. On Metacritic, the film has a weighted average score of 30 out of 100, based on eight critics, indicating "generally unfavorable reviews".

Frank Scheck of The Hollywood Reporter referred to the movie as "slapdash", and called the special effects "garish and unconvincing"; the movie's sharks he thought were "Sharknado-style". Glenn Kenny of RogerEbert.com thought, just as Scheck and many other reviewers did, that such a "harrowing" story would have been adapted to the screen far earlier. His consensus was the film was "not exactly unwatchable", but also "completely not worthy of watching", with its "lazy inattention to period detail", summing it up as "two-hours plus of bumbling and pandering". 

Neil Genzlinger of The New York Times'' criticized the film's "lack of subtlety" in dealing with such an "almost unbelievable" story. He called the characters' storylines away from the main plot "flimsy" and the special effects "rickety", and noted that the film's "leaden" treatment of the central story "suck[ed] all the drama out of it".

References

External links 
 
 
USS Indianapolis: Men of Courage at Shark Utopia

American disaster films
Disaster films based on actual events
Films about the atomic bombings of Hiroshima and Nagasaki
Films about seafaring accidents or incidents
Films about sharks
Films about survivors of seafaring accidents or incidents
Films directed by Mario Van Peebles
Films set in 1945
Films set in the Pacific Ocean
Films set in Hiroshima
Films set in Japan
Films set in Okinawa Prefecture
Films shot in Alabama
Films set on beaches
Films set on islands
Films set on ships
Films shot in Mobile, Alabama
Films shot in San Francisco
Films shot in Japan
Films with underwater settings
Saban Films films
Seafaring films based on actual events
Thriller films based on actual events
Films about the United States Navy in World War II
World War II films based on actual events
Works about Pacific theatre of World War II
Pacific War films
Japan in non-Japanese culture
2010s English-language films
2010s American films